MRS Bulletin is published by the Materials Research Society in partnership with Springer Nature. It was established in 1974 as the MRS Newsletter. There was a year gap in 1981, and then in 1982, it came back as MRS Bulletin.

The current editor is Gopal R. Rao (2011–present). The previous editor was Elizabeth Fleischer (1991 to 2011).

Abstracting and indexing
The journal is abstracted and indexed in
 Current Contents Engineering, Technology, and Applied Sciences
 Current Contents Physical Chemical and Earth Sciences
 SciSearch online database
 Research Alert
 Science Citation Index
 Materials Science Citation Index
 Scopus

According to Journal Citation Reports, the journal has a 2020 impact factor of 6.578.

References 

Materials science journals
Cambridge University Press academic journals
English-language journals
Academic journals associated with learned and professional societies
Monthly journals
Publications established in 1974